is a Japanese politician and member of the House of Councillors for the Japanese Communist Party. He has been elected to this position three times, in 2001, 2007, and 2013.

References

1958 births
Living people
Members of the House of Councillors (Japan)
Japanese Communist Party politicians